The I-10 High Rise Bridge, known locally as the High Rise, is a bridge carrying 6 lanes of Interstate 10 (I-10) over the Industrial Canal in New Orleans, Louisiana. It also has multiple parts.

See also

References

Bridges in New Orleans
Road bridges in Louisiana
Interstate 10
Bridges on the Interstate Highway System
1966 establishments in Louisiana
Bridges completed in 1966